Schlossberg Castle may refer to the following:
Castles in Austria
  Schloßberg (Moosbach), ruined castle near Moosbach in the  Innviertel, Upper Austria
 Schlossberg Castle (Seefeld in Tirol), in Innsbruck Land, Tyrol
Castles in Germany
 Schloßberg Castle (Dettingen), ruined castle near Dettingen in the county of Esslingen, Baden-Württemberg
  Schlossberg Castle (Gablingen), ruined castle in Germany
  Schlossberg Castle (Gauting), ruined castle in Germany
 Lohra Castle, ruined castle in Großlohra in the county of Nordhausen in Thuringia
  Schlossberg Castle (Haidhof), ruined castle near Egloffstein in the Upper Franconian county of Forchheim in Bavaria
 Schlossberg Castle (Heggbach), ruined castle in der Gemeinde Laupheim in the county of Biberach, Baden-Württemberg
  Schlossberg Castle (Kümmersreuth), ruined castle near Bad Staffelstein in the county of Lichtenfels, Bavaria
 Habsberg Castle, also called Schlossberg Castle, ruined castle in the municipality of  Langenenslingen in the county of Biberach in Baden-Württemberg
 Schlossberg Castle (Uttenweiler), ruined castle in der municipality of Uttenweiler in the county of Biberach, Baden-Württemberg
 Castles elsewhere in Europe
 Kamenický hrad, Gothic castle on a hill called, in German, the Schlossberg, in the Bohemian Central Highlands, Czech Republic
 Schlossberg Castle (La Neuveville), above the small town of La Neuveville, canton of Berne, Switzerland

See also  
 Schlossberg (disambiguation)